María Lorena Ramírez Hernández (born 1 January 1995) is an indigenous long-distance runner belonging to the Rarámuri ethnic group, who lives in the state of Chihuahua, Mexico. She became known internationally after having won the Cerro Rojo UltraTrail in 2017, an ultra-distance race of 50 kilometers, in a time of 07:20, and for having also done it with huaraches, without shoes or sports equipment. She competes wearing traditional garb, including her trademark long skirt. Despite being a high-performance athlete, she does not receive government sports support. Her example influences Rarámuri children to develop as runners in the heights of the sierra in Chihuahua.

Biography
Ramírez was born and has habitually resided in the locality of Ciénaga de Noragachi, in the municipality of Guachochi, and she lives with her brother in Rejocochi. She takes care of her family's cattle and is also dedicated to the practice of sport. She also belongs to a Mexican indigenous community historically known for its resistance and for its special gifts for long-distance running; in fact, the term Rarámuri means "light feet".

Her brother, her father and her grandfather have also been runners, and her brother, Mario, also participates in the same races as she. Ramírez even participates in races at greater distances (100 km) and has been among the first, in some of them.

In 2019 Ramírez was the subject of a Netflix documentary, Lorena, Light-Footed Woman. In October 2019 she appeared on the cover of Vogue Mexico.

References

1995 births
Living people
Sportspeople from Chihuahua (state)
Mexican female long-distance runners
Female ultramarathon runners
Mexican female marathon runners
Indigenous Mexican women
21st-century Mexican women